The 2023 Argentine Primera División - Liga Profesional (officially the Torneo Binance 2023 for sponsorship reasons) is the 133rd season of top-flight professional football in Argentina. The league season began on 27 January and will end on 30 July 2023.

Twenty-eight teams compete in the league: twenty-six returning from the 2022 season as well as two promoted teams from the 2022 Primera Nacional (Belgrano and Instituto). Boca Juniors are the defending champions.

Competition format
The competition will be run under a single round-robin, contested by 28 teams (26 from the previous edition plus 2 promoted from Primera Nacional). The champions will qualify for the 2024 Copa Libertadores as Argentina 1. The qualification for international tournaments will be determined by an aggregate table of the 2023 Primera División and 2023 Copa de la Liga Profesional first stage tournaments.

In this season three teams will be relegated to the Primera Nacional. Two teams will be relegated based on coefficients, as the previous season, while the bottom team of the 2023 aggregate table will also be relegated.

Club information

Stadia and locations

Personnel

Managerial changes

1. Originally  Luca Marcogiuseppe would be manager of Arsenal along with Carlos Ruiz, but he resigned before the beginning of the season. Marcogiuseppe was replaced by Martín Cicotello.
Interim managers
2.  Marcelo Bravo and  Hernán Manrique were interim managers in the 6th round.

Foreign players

Players holding Argentinian dual nationality
They do not take up a foreign slot.

 Dylan Gissi (Banfield)
 Norberto Briasco (Boca Juniors)
 Frank Fabra (Boca Juniors)

 Matías Soria (Godoy Cruz)
 Cristian Báez (Independiente)
 Julio César Soler (Lanús)
 Gabriel Arias (Racing)
 Tomás Avilés (Racing)
 Catriel Cabellos (Racing)
 Nicolás de la Cruz (River Plate)
 David Martínez (River Plate)
 Luca Martínez (Rosario Central)
 Iván Leguizamón (San Lorenzo)
 Andrés Vombergar (San Lorenzo)
 José Mauri (Sarmiento (J))
 Mateo Retegui (Tigre)
 Lenny Lobato (Vélez Sarsfield)

Source: AFA

League table

Results
Teams will play every other team once (either at home or away) completing a total of 27 rounds.

Season statistics

Top goalscorers

Source: AFA

Top assists

Source: AFA

Aggregate table

International qualification
The 2023 Argentine Primera División champions, 2023 Copa de la Liga Profesional champions and 2023 Copa Argentina champions will earn a berth to the 2024 Copa Libertadores. The remaining berths to the 2024 Copa Libertadores as well as the ones to the 2024 Copa Sudamericana will be determined by an aggregate table of the 2023 Argentine Primera División and 2023 Copa de la Liga Profesional first stage tournaments. The top three teams in the aggregate table not already qualified for any international tournament qualified for the Copa Libertadores, while the next six teams qualified for the Copa Sudamericana.

Relegation
In this season, the bottom team of the aggregate table will be relegated to the 2024 Primera Nacional. If two or more teams are level on points, extra matches will be played to decide which team will be relegated.

Relegation based on coefficients
In addition to the relegation based on the aggregate table, two teams will be relegated at the end of the season based on coefficients, which take into consideration the points obtained by the clubs during the present season (aggregate table points) and the two previous seasons (only seasons at the top flight are counted). The total tally was then divided by the number of games played in the top flight over those three seasons and an average was calculated. The two teams with the worst average at the end of the season will be relegated to Primera Nacional.

Source: AFA

References

External links
 LPF official site

Argentine Primera División seasons
2023 in Argentine football
Argentina